

This is a list of countries ordered by annual per capita consumption of tea, .

Gallery of tea varieties from highest consuming countries

See also
List of countries by alcohol consumption per capita
List of countries by milk consumption per capita

References

Food- and drink-related lists
Lists of countries by per capita values
Tea
Tea culture